Eden Patera is a feature located in the Ismenius Lacus quadrangle on the planet Mars, in the highland region Arabia Terra.  It is approximately circular and 82 km in diameter.  It was named in 2012 by the IAU.

See also
Orcus Patera
Eden Patera

References

Surface features of Mars